Deinomenes was a sculptor listed by Pliny the Elder as one of the most celebrated brass sculptors and dates him as flourishing in 95th Olympiad, B. C. 400. Pliny credits him with the creation of two sculptures: the first is of Protesilaus - a figure from the Iliad believed to be the first Greek to die at Troy. The second was of a wrestler named Pythodemus. He was also responsible for two statues located in the Acropolis in the lifetime of Pausanias. The statues are of Io and Callisto.

Tatian mentions him disparagingly in his Oratio ad Graecos, attributing to him a statue of Besantis, queen of the Paeonians, who Tatian treats as a historical figure, but who was probably mythical.
His name also appears on the base of another statue from the Acropolis, crediting him as the sculptor, but the statue itself is lost.

References

Bibliography

 
 

 
 

 

Ancient Greek sculptors
4th-century BC Greek sculptors